is a Japanese amateur astronomer, observer of variable stars, discoverer of comet C/1970 B1, and co-discoverer of the main-belt asteroid 7752 Otauchunokai, named after the Ota Uchuno Kai group, an amateur astronomers' club at Ōta city, of which he is a member of.

The inner main-belt asteroid 26168 Kanaikiyotaka was named after him on 21 September 2002.

References 
 

20th-century Japanese astronomers
1951 births
Living people